Nicolás Iván Orellana Acuña (born 3 September 1995) is a Chilean footballer who currently plays for Unión La Calera as a striker.

Honours

Club
Colo-Colo
 Primera división de Chile (2): 2014,  2017
Supercopa de Chile: 2018

References

External links
 
 Orellana at Football-Lineups

1995 births
Living people
Footballers from Santiago
Chilean footballers
Chile under-20 international footballers
Association football forwards
Segunda División Profesional de Chile players
Chilean Primera División players
Colo-Colo B footballers
Colo-Colo footballers
San Marcos de Arica footballers
Everton de Viña del Mar footballers
Universidad de Concepción footballers
Audax Italiano footballers
Unión La Calera footballers